Tze Kam Hung is a Hong Kong footballer who competed for the Republic of China in the 1948 Summer Olympics.

References

External links

China international footballers
Chinese footballers
Olympic footballers of China
Footballers at the 1948 Summer Olympics
Hong Kong footballers
Association football defenders